Varisco is a surname. Notable people with the surname include:

Bernardino Varisco (1850–1933), Italian philosopher
Daniel Martin Varisco (born 1951), American anthropologist and historian
Franco Varisco (1887–1970), Italian footballer
Grazia Varisco (born 1937), Italian artist
Michel Varisco (born 1967), American artist